K2 is the 1995 debut album by Serbian pop duo K2. It was released in the beginning of 1995.

The album contains 11 songs. The producers of all the songs on the album were sisters Kovač themselves, with Aleksandra being the main and Kristina, a co-producer. The first single "Ajmo u život" became very popular in Serbia at the time (January 1995), and rapidly became their signature song and tune. In total, three songs were released off the album, and for all of the singles were shot videos.

Track listing
 "Ajmo u život" – 3:45
 "Bilo gde, bilo kad " – 4:55
 "Crna k'o noć" – 3:37
 "Super žena" – 4:09
 "K's Got Curve" – 3:53
 "Milo moje" – 5:15
 "Džangl Manija" – 3:17
 "Ljubav je..." – 3:35
 "1000 Km" – 4:27
 "Šta me briga" – 3:14
 "Ako odlaziš" – 4:09

References

1995 albums